Analogy is the debut studio album by the band Analogy. The album was reissued in 2004 on Akarma Records.

Track listing
All tracks were written by Martin Thurn, unless otherwise noted.
Dark Reflections - 7:07
Weeping My Endure (John Milton, Thurn) - 4:54
Indian Meditation - 4:22
Tin's Song - 1:41
Analogy (Analogy) - 9:50
The Year's at the Spring (Elizabeth Barrett Browning, Thurn, Jutta Nienhaus) - 4:43
Pan-Am Flight 249 (Thurn, Nienhaus) - 5:18

2001 Reissue Bonus Track
Milan on a Sunday Morning (Analogy) - 6:07

References

External links
 phrockblog
 
 
 ohrwaschl catalogue
at green-brain-krautrock.de
progblog.splinder.com

1972 debut albums